Joe Millea (born 1941 in Ballycallan, County Kilkenny, Ireland) is an Irish former hurler who played for his local club Graigue–Ballycallan and at senior level for the Kilkenny county team from 1969 until 1970. He won an All-Ireland SHC medal in 1969.

References

1941 births
Living people
All-Ireland Senior Hurling Championship winners
Graigue-Ballycallan hurlers
Kilkenny inter-county hurlers
Leinster inter-provincial hurlers